Boston Biomedical Research Institute (BBRI) was a non-profit institution concentrating on basic biomedical research to promote the understanding of human diseases (including heart disease, cancer, muscular dystrophy and Alzheimer's etc.). It was located in Watertown, Massachusetts.

History 

BBRI was founded in the late 1960s, and relied on federal money to fund most of its research. In 2008 it received a grant to establish a muscular dystrophy research center.

In 2012, reports surfaced that the Institute was financially unsustainable. In the face of a shrinking endowment and decrease of NIH funds, the BBRI Board of Trustees recommended in September, 2012 that the Institute begin a dissolution process. It was also revealed that the institute's funding situation was further hurt when four senior scientists who had significant NIH funding decided to leave BBRI. Members of the Institute's Corporation met on November 15, 2012 and voted to begin the process of closing the Institute.

As of early 2013, the research institute was still in the process of winding down operations. BBRI was also negotiating with Tufts HMO to sell its 1.3 acre property in Watertown, Massachusetts. The proceeds of the sale would be used to pay off some of the organization's creditors.

Timeline 
1950: Charles Schepens founded The Retina Foundation
1968: The Retina Foundation was separated into two institutions: the Boston Biomedical Research Institute and the Eye Research Institute of the Retina Foundation.
2003: Charles Emerson is appointed as new Director

Faculty 
Andrew Bohm
Dave W. Carmichael
Lynne M. Coluccio
Roberto Dominguez
Janice Dominov
Martin L. Duennwald
Charles P. Emerson, Jr.
Peter Erhardt
Jaya Pal Gangopadhyay
John Gergely
Zenon Grabarek
Philip Graceffa
Markus Hardt
Celia Harrison
Sachiko Homma
Noriaki Ikemoto
Peter L. Jones 
Oliver King 
Toshio Kitazawa
Paul C. Leavis
Sherwin S. Lehrer
Katsuhide Mabuchi
Jeffrey Boone Miller
Kent Nybakken
Henry Paulus
Lucia Rameh
Victor A. Raso
Nilima Sarkar
James L. Sherley
Janet Smith
Walter F. Stafford, III
Eric J Sundberg
Shinichi Takayama
Alex Toker
Hiroshi Tokuo
Moonkyoung Um
Chih-Lueh Albert Wang
Sarah Wilcox-Adelman
Hartmut Wohlrab

References

 

Non-profit organizations based in Massachusetts
Watertown, Massachusetts
Medical research institutes in Massachusetts